Aberdeen, British Columbia may refer to:

Aberdeen, Abbotsford, a neighbourhood in Abbotsford, British Columbia
Aberdeen, Kamloops, a neighbourhood in Kamloops, British Columbia